Adil Shah Suri was the seventh and final ruler of the Sur Empire. He was the brother in law of Sikandar Shah Suri, who ruled over a region east of Delhi after Sikandar Shah Suri was defeated by Humayun in 1555. He and Sikandar Shah Suri were contenders for the Delhi throne against the Mughal emperor Akbar.

Early in Adil Shah's reign, he fought back a challenge from Muhammad Shah, ruler of Bengal. At the battle of Chhapparghatta in December 1555, Adil Shah and his Hindu general Hemu routed the Bengali forces and Muhammad Shah was killed.  The following year, following the child-Emperor Akbar's absence from Delhi on a campaign, Hemu attacked and defeated the regent Tardi Beg Khan who fled the city of Delhi and started building up an army in the Punjab to retake Delhi.  This was Hemu's 22nd successive victory in battle and rather than appoint Adil Shah as ruler he appointed himself ruler.

Meanwhile, the Bengal throne had passed on to Ghiyasuddin Abul Muzaffar Bahadur Shah, son of the slain Muhammad Shah.  After killing an ambitious uncle, Bahadur Shah marched against Adil Shah to avenge his father's murder. In the battle of Fathpur in Munghyr in April 1557 Adil Shah's army was routed and Adil himself was captured and killed, bringing an effective end to the Sur Empire.

See also
History of India
Sur Empire

1557 deaths
Sur Empire
Indian Muslims
Indian people of Pashtun descent
Indian people of Afghan descent
Year of birth unknown
Dynasties of India